The Meso-Cordilleran languages are a group of languages spoken in or near the Cordillera Central mountain range in Northern Luzon. Its speakers are culturally very diverse, and include the lowland Pangasinense, the Igorot highlanders, and Alta-speaking Aeta groups.

Languages
Classification per Himes (2005):

Northern Alta
Southern Alta
South-Central Cordilleran
Central Cordilleran
Isinai
North Central Cordilleran
Kalinga–Itneg
Itneg (a dialect cluster)
Kalinga (a dialect cluster)
Nuclear Cordilleran
Ifugao
Balangao
Bontok–Kankanay
Bontok–Finallig
Kankanaey
Southern Cordilleran
Ilongot
West Southern Cordilleran
Pangasinan
Nuclear Southern Cordilleran
Ibaloi
Karao
Iwaak
Kallahan

References

 
Northern Luzon languages